Marcel Meran was a French sailor, who represented his country at the 1900 Summer Olympics in Meulan, France. With Émile Michelet as helmsman, Meran took the 3rd place in the race of the .5 to 1 ton.

Further reading

References

External links

French male sailors (sport)
Sailors at the 1900 Summer Olympics – .5 to 1 ton
Olympic sailors of France
Year of birth missing
Year of death missing
Olympic silver medalists for France
Olympic bronze medalists for France
Olympic medalists in sailing
Place of birth missing
Place of death missing